Henry Charles Brace (March 23, 1823 – August 25, 1895) was a member of the Wisconsin State Assembly.

Brace was born in Stockbridge, Massachusetts. Other positions Brace held include chairman of the Town Board of Supervisors of Fountain Prairie, Wisconsin. He was a Republican.

Brace died in Harvey, Illinois and was buried in Fall River, Wisconsin.

References

External links

People from Stockbridge, Massachusetts
People from Fountain Prairie, Wisconsin
Mayors of places in Wisconsin
Republican Party members of the Wisconsin State Assembly
1823 births
1895 deaths